Dabnik Peak is a peak rising to 1038 m off the west extremity of Laclavère Plateau on Trinity Peninsula, Antarctic Peninsula.  Situated on the east side of Misty Pass, 14.2 km southeast of Cape Ducorps, 11.14 km southwest of Ami Boué Bluff and 9.81 km west-northwest of Kanitz Nunatak.  Surmounting Broad Valley to the south and Ogoya Glacier to the northwest.

The peak is named after the town of Dolni (Lower) Dabnik in northern Bulgaria.

Location

German-British mapping in 1996.

Maps
 Trinity Peninsula. Scale 1:250000 topographic map No. 5697. Institut für Angewandte Geodäsie and British Antarctic Survey, 1996.
 Antarctic Digital Database (ADD). Scale 1:250000 topographic map of Antarctica. Scientific Committee on Antarctic Research (SCAR), 1993–2016.

Notes

References
 Bulgarian Antarctic Gazetteer. Antarctic Place-names Commission. (details in Bulgarian, basic data in English)
 SCAR Composite Antarctic Gazetteer.

External links
 Dabnik Peak. Copernix satellite image

Mountains of Trinity Peninsula
Bulgaria and the Antarctic